Bristowe may refer to:

 Ethel Bristowe (1862–1952), painter and author
 John Syer Bristowe (1827–1895), physician
 Kaitlyn Bristowe (born 1985), contestant
 Orme Bristowe (1895–1938). cricketer and golfer
 Samuel Bristowe (1822–1897), politician 
 Thomas Bristowe (1833–1892), politician
 W. S. Bristowe (1901–1979), naturalist
 Wally Bristowe (1922–2013), footballer

See also
 Briscoe (disambiguation)
 Bristow (disambiguation)